The Riddler Revenge is a Zamperla Giant Discovery Frisbee ride that pendulums riders at Six Flags Over Texas. It opened on May 28, 2016.

History
On September 3, 2015, Six Flags Over Texas announced that they would be adding three new flat rides to the Gotham City section. One of these rides would be the Riddler Revenge. The Riddler Revenge would be a Zamperla Giant Discovery, very similar to Black Widow at Kennywood.

The Riddler Revenge would open to guests in 2016.

Ride
The giant circle swings in a pendulum motion while switching between clockwise and counterclockwise rotations. However, due to multiple problems with motors burning out often, the Park has decreased the maximum height of the swing to only about 90 degrees from center. Now the maximum speed is decreased due to it no longer swinging to 120 degrees.

See also

 2016 in amusement parks

References

External links

Amusement rides introduced in 2016
Pendulum rides
Amusement rides manufactured by Zamperla
Warner Bros. Global Brands and Experiences attractions